The 1894–95 Scottish Districts season is a record of all the rugby union matches for Scotland's district teams.

History

The scoring was tweaked again this season, to give greater emphasis on try-scoring. A 'goal' - a try and conversion - remained 5 points; but the try was now greater value than the conversion (3pts to 2pts).

Glasgow District beat Edinburgh District in the Inter-City match. The gate money was estimated at £150. The Scottish Referee noted that it was unfortunate that Glasgow District's and West of Scotland FC's player Charles Nicholl was not eligible for Scotland.

The North of Scotland v South of Scotland match was called off due to the frost.

Results

Inter-City

Glasgow District:

Edinburgh District: 

Glasgow District:

South of Scotland District: 

Edinburgh District:

North of Scotland District:

Other Scottish matches

Provinces:

Cities:

English matches

No other District matches played.

International matches

No touring matches this season.

References

1894–95 in Scottish rugby union
Scottish Districts seasons